Crassula barbata, also known as the bearded-leaved crassula, is a species of flowering plant in the genus Crassula found in South Africa. Crassula barbata subsp. broomii is a subspecies, also found in South Africa.

References

Flora of South Africa
barbata